This was the first edition of the tournament.

Aliona Bolsova and Andrea Gámiz won the title, defeating Réka Luca Jani and Panna Udvardy in the final, 7–5, 6–3.

Seeds

Draw

Draw

References

External Links
Main Draw

Țiriac Foundation Trophy – 2